The 1969 LPGA Tour was the 20th season since the LPGA Tour officially began in 1950. The season ran from January 16 to November 2. The season consisted of 29 official money events. Carol Mann won the most tournaments, eight. She also led the money list with earnings of $49,152.

There were two first-time winners in 1969: Donna Caponi and JoAnne Carner, who would win 43 LPGA events in her career.

The tournament results and award winners are listed below.

Tournament results
The following table shows all the official money events for the 1969 season. "Date" is the ending date of the tournament. The numbers in parentheses after the winners' names are the number of wins they had on the tour up to and including that event. Majors are shown in bold.

am - amateur
* - non-member at time of win

Awards

References

External links
LPGA Tour official site
1969 season coverage at golfobserver.com

LPGA Tour seasons
LPGA Tour